The 1895–96 season was the 4th season in Liverpool F.C.'s existence, and was their third year in The Football League, in which they competed in the Second Division. The season covers the period from 1 July 1895 to 30 June 1896. Liverpool won the second division title and got promoted to the first division after winning two and drawing one of four test matches, which were played at home and away against Small Heath and West Bromwich Albion.

Liverpool scored 106 league goals in 30 games, a record total for a league season which still stands.

References

External links
LFC History Season 1895-96
1895–96 Liverpool F.C.Results
LFC Kit 1895-96

1895-1896
English football clubs 1895–96 season